Peter David Handyside (born 31 July 1974) is a Scottish former professional footballer who played as a defender from 1992 until 2007.

Despite being Scottish, Handyside played his entire career in England, having initially came through the youth ranks at Heston Rovers he was scouted by Grimsby Town who signed him as a junior before promoting him to the first team in 1992. Handyside went on to make over 200 appearances for Grimsby in all competitions and was in the team that won the Football League Second Division play-offs and Football League Trophy during the 1997–98 season. In 2001 after nine years at Blundell Park, Handyside joined Stoke City who he went on to captain and eventually earning promotion out of the Second Division like he had previously done at Grimsby. In 2003, he signed with Barnsley where he remained for a year before dropping into non-league football with Northwich Victoria. In 2006, he signed with Hucknall Town before retiring at the end of the 2006–07 season at the age of 33.

Career

Early career
Handyside was a product of the youth system at Heston Rovers a local side from his home town of Dumfries. He also had a spell on the books of the youth team of Queen of the South including playing in a BP Youth Cup second round tie against Celtic on 31 October 1990.

Grimsby Town
Handyside was trialed by Grimsby Town and was signed by the club's youth team in 1990. He took his step up into the first team in 1992 and was eventually the club's long term replacement for veteran centre back Paul Futcher and made an excellent pairing with Mark Lever. Handyside's maturity grew and he became an integral part of Grimsby's defensive setup, and along with Lever, John McDermott, Tony Gallimore, Graham Rodger, Kevin Jobling and Richard Smith was part of arguably Grimsby's best ever defence. The 1997–1998 Handyside continued to be the nucleus of Town's strong defence that helped achieve a promotion to back to the First Division via the play-offs, and victory in the Football League Trophy. He bowed out at Grimsby after the 2000–01 season. An injury troubled campaign, he was often replaced by loan signing Zhang Enhua. At the end of the season, he rejected the chance to stay on with Grimsby and moved to Second Division Stoke City.

Stoke City
Handyside joined Stoke City in the summer of 2001 on a free-transfer and was made club captain. He played in 41 matches in 2001–02 including the 2002 Football League Second Division play-off Final which saw Stoke beat Brentford to gain promotion. That season he also scored his first and only goal for Stoke in an FA Cup tie against Lewes. He missed only three matches in 2002–03 as Stoke narrowly avoided relegation and at the end of the campaign he was released by Tony Pulis.

Barnsley
In 2003, he made a move to Barnsley but after a season hit with fitness and injury problems he departed Oakwell at the end of the 2003–04 season.

Northwich Victoria
His next port of call was to make a move to Conference club Northwich Victoria where he captained the Vics for two seasons before being released.

Hucknall Town
Hucknall Town signed Handyside for the 2006–07 campaign. He remained at the club for one year before leaving the club on a free transfer. Handyside has played alongside his fellow Grimsby promotion winning teammate Tony Gallimore at four different clubs: Grimsby, Barnsley, Northwich Victoria and Hucknall; the only team at which Peter has not played with Tony is Stoke City, ironically Gallimore's first senior club.

Personal life
Since retiring from professional football Handyside has worked as a delivery driver for Gilberts Furniture on the Fenton Industrial Estate in Stoke on Trent. In December 2013 Handyside's daughter was diagnosed with leukaemia, and in 2014 she launched her own campaign named "Maia's Mission".

Career statistics
Sourced from 

A.  The "Other" column constitutes appearances and goals in the Anglo-Italian Cup, Football League Trophy.

Honours
 Grimsby Town
Second Division play-off winner: 1997–98
Football League Trophy winner: 1997–98

 Stoke City
Second Division play-off winner: 2001–02

References

External links

1974 births
Living people
Queen of the South F.C. players
Stoke City F.C. players
Grimsby Town F.C. players
Barnsley F.C. players
Northwich Victoria F.C. players
Hucknall Town F.C. players
Scottish footballers
English Football League players
National League (English football) players
Footballers from Dumfries
Scotland under-21 international footballers
Association football defenders